Ehrenfeld is a borough in Cambria County, Pennsylvania, United States. It is part of the Johnstown, Pennsylvania Metropolitan Statistical Area. The population was 228 at the 2010 census.

Geography
Ehrenfeld is located in south-central Cambria County at  (40.372273, -78.776394), in the valley of the Little Conemaugh River. It is bordered to the east by the borough of Summerhill and to the southwest by the borough of South Fork. U.S. Route 219 passes through the eastern part of Ehrenfeld, with access from one exit (Pennsylvania Route 53). US 219 leads north  to Ebensburg, the county seat, and southwest  to Somerset.

Demographics

At the 2000 census there were 234 people, 90 households, and 65 families in the borough. The population density was 600.5 people per square mile (231.7/km²). There were 97 housing units at an average density of 248.9 per square mile (96.0/km²).  The racial makeup of the borough was 100.00% White.
There were 90 households, 30.0% had children under the age of 18 living with them, 57.8% were married couples living together, 10.0% had a female householder with no husband present, and 26.7% were non-families. 24.4% of households were made up of individuals, and 15.6% were one person aged 65 or older. The average household size was 2.60 and the average family size was 3.11.

The age distribution was 24.8% under the age of 18, 7.7% from 18 to 24, 25.2% from 25 to 44, 26.5% from 45 to 64, and 15.8% 65 or older. The median age was 39 years. For every 100 females there were 98.3 males. For every 100 females age 18 and over, there were 97.8 males.

The median household income was $28,125 and the median family income  was $30,500. Males had a median income of $25,000 versus $15,781 for females. The per capita income for the borough was $11,037. About 10.0% of families and 11.4% of the population were below the poverty line, including 7.9% of those under the age of eighteen and none of those sixty five or over.

History
In 1901, General Electric Company built the first alternating current power plant at Ehrenfeld. The plant, designed to eliminate the difficulties in long-distance direct current transmission, was built for the Webster Coal and Coke Company.

Notable person
Actor Charles Bronson was born and raised in Ehrenfeld.

References

Populated places established in 1956
Boroughs in Cambria County, Pennsylvania
1956 establishments in Pennsylvania